American Spirit is an album released on American Gramaphone in 2003 (see 2003 in music) as a collaboration between Mannheim Steamroller and country musician C. W. McCall. The album focuses on American patriotic songs, hence the title. McCall contributed to a number of spoken word songs on the album and rerecorded his 1976 hit song "Convoy" for it; this was also the case with another song of his, "Wolf Creek Pass," which can be found on the album.  McCall is a persona created by Bill Fries and Manheim Steamroller leader Chip Davis; Fries provides the vocals as McCall.  This was the last album to feature C. W. McCall.

Track listing
 "Star Spangled Banner" (Francis Scott Key, John Stafford Smith) – 2:41
 "American Spirit" (Bill Fries, Chip Davis) – 2:38
 "America the Beautiful" (Katharine Lee Bates, Samuel A. Ward) – 3:44
 "Convoy" (Fries, Davis) – 3:53
 "Fanfare for the Common Man" (Aaron Copland) – 3:48
 "Yellowstone Morning" (Davis) – 2:53
 "Heritage" (Davis) – 4:40
 "Wolf Creek Pass" (Fries, Davis) – 4:02
 "Home on the Range" (Brewster Higley, Daniel Kelly) – 4:18
 "Mt. McKinley" (Davis) – 2:54
 "Cloudburst" (Ferde Grofe) – 9:31
 "Tin Type" (Fries, Davis) – 4:49
 "Battle Hymn of the Republic" (Julia Ward Howe) – 4:45

Personnel

 C. W. McCall - Vocals
 Chip Davis - Percussion, Drums and Toys, Conductor, Producer
 Jackson Berkey - Keyboards
 Ron Cooley - Bass and All Fretted Instruments
 Arnie Roth - Violin Solos, Concertmaster
 Bobby Jenkins - Oboe Solos
 Members of the Chicago Symphony Chorus
 Duain Wolfe - Chorus Director and Conductor
 Dale Clevenger, Oto Carrillo, Greg Flint, Melanie Cottle - Horn
 John Hagstrom, Mark Ridenour, Tage Larson - Trumpet
 Ward Stare, Adam Moen - Tenor Trombone
 Charles Vernon - Bass Trombone
 Charlie Suchat - Tuba
 Doug Waddell - Timpani
 Ted Atkatz, Mike Folker - Percussion

Additional personnel

 Chris Sabold, Mike Konopka, Dick Lewsey - Engineers
 Mat Lejeune, Brian Pinke, Mike Scasiwicz, Darren Styles - Assistant Engineers
 Metro Mobile - Recording

References

External links
 NarrowGauge.org album information for American Spirit

American Spirit
American Spirit
American Spirit
American Gramaphone albums